Antanas Rimvydas Čaplinskas (28 March 1939 – 13 December 2011) was a Lithuanian energy engineer, historian and prominent author of books about history of Vilnius. He was a Member of the First Council of the Vilnius city Sąjūdis, later from 1990 to 1995 he worked in the Vilnius City Council. In 2008, Čaplinskas was awarded the Statuette of Saint Christopher for his scientific works about Vilnius.

Works
 Vilniaus gatvės. Istorija, vardynas, žemėlapiai, Vilnius, 2000.
 Šv. Jono, Dominikonų, Trakų gatvės, Vilnius, 1998, 2008.
 Trilogy Vilniaus gatvių istorija:
 Valdovų kelias. Rūdninkų gatvė, Vilnius, 2001.
 Valdovų kelias. Didžioji gatvė, Vilnius, 2002.
 Valdovų kelias. Pilies gatvė, Vilnius, 2005.
 Vilniaus istorija: legendos ir tikrovė, Vilnius, 2010.
 Vilniaus atminimo knyga: mieste įamžintos asmenybės, Vilnius, 2011.

References

1939 births
2011 deaths
People from Marijampolė Municipality
People from Kalvarija, Lithuania
Historians of Lithuania
Lithuanian engineers
21st-century Lithuanian historians